Nkio may refer to:

 Old Nkio, a village in Tening Circle, Nagaland, India
 New Nkio, a village in Kebai Khelma Circle, Nagaland, India
 Nkio B, a village in Kebai Khelma Circle, Nagaland, India